Carinina is a genus of nemerteans belonging to the family Tubulanidae.

The species of this genus are found in Europe and Northern America.

Species:

Carinina antarctica 
Carinina arenaria 
Carinina atavia

References

Palaeonemertea
Nemertea genera